Baradero is the oldest town of Buenos Aires Province, Argentina, being founded in 1615. It is the administrative centre for Baradero Partido.

Geography
It is located on the bank of the Baradero River which is a tributary of the Paraná River.

Gallery

External links

  Portal de la Ciudad de Baradero
 Baradero
  BaraderoDigital
  Festival de Baradero
  Web de Baradero y su Festival
  Baradero Municipality
  Baradero - official site

Populated places in Buenos Aires Province
Populated places established in 1615
1615 establishments in the Spanish Empire